General  James Coates (1740 – 22 July 1822) was a British Army officer who became colonel of the 2nd (The Queen's Royal) Regiment of Foot.

Military career
Coates was commissioned as an ensign in the 19th Regiment of Foot on 25 December 1755. He commanded his regiment at the Battle of Monck's Corner in April 1780 and at the Siege of Ninety-Six in May 1781 during the American Revolutionary War and commanded a brigade during the Flanders Campaign. He went on to be colonel of the 2nd (The Queen's Royal) Regiment of Foot on 20 December 1794.

References

Sources

1740 births
1822 deaths
British Army generals
British Army personnel of the American Revolutionary War
British Army personnel of the French Revolutionary Wars
Green Howards officers
Queen's Royal Regiment officers